"The Train Is Coming" is a 1966 single by Jamaican musician Ken Boothe, and one of Boothe's earliest successful songs. It was written by Boothe and Coxsone Dodd. The 1966 version was backed by The Wailers. In 1995 Boothe re-worked a version of the song with recording artist Shaggy, and that version was used in the soundtrack for the film Money Train. The British reggae band UB40 covered the song as a UK single, which is included on their album Labour of Love III.

UK chart positions
The Shaggy version reached 21 in 1996, staying in the chart for five weeks. The UB40 version reached 30 in the UK Singles Chart in 1999 staying in the charts for two weeks.

References

Songs about trains
1966 singles
1966 songs
UB40 songs
Ken Boothe songs
1996 singles
1999 singles
Shaggy (musician) songs
Reggae songs
Songs written by Coxsone Dodd
Virgin Records singles